The Lung Lough Gara Way is a long-distance trail in Ireland. It is a  hiking trail that begins in Castlerea, County Roscommon. It is typically completed in three days. It forms part of the Beara-Breifne Way and shares part of its route with the Suck Valley Way, and as such, follows quiet local roads, pasture and bog land to link in with the Miners Way. This trail forms part of the Beara Breifne Way. It has received funding for its development from the Irish government for its development.

References

Trails
Hiking trails in Europe